5010 Amenemhêt is a stony asteroid from the central region of the asteroid belt, approximately 9 kilometers in diameter.

It was discovered on 24 September 1960, by Dutch astronomer couple Ingrid and Cornelis van Houten at Leiden, on photographic plates taken by Dutch–American astronomer Tom Gehrels at the U.S Palomar Observatory, California, and assigned the provisional designation . It was later named after the Egyptian pharaoh Amenemhět III.

Orbit and classification 

Amenemhêt orbits the Sun in the central main-belt at a distance of 2.2–3.3 AU once every 4 years and 6 months (1,633 days). Its orbit has an eccentricity of 0.20 and an inclination of 15° with respect to the ecliptic. Its observation arc already begins in 1955, due to precoveries taken at the U.S. Goethe Link Observatory in Indiana.

Physical characteristics 

In the SMASS taxonomic scheme, Amenemhêt is classified as a common stony asteroid with a S-type spectrum. It has also been characterized as a S-type by Pan-STARRS large-scale survey.

Lightcurve 

A rotational lightcurve was obtained through photometric observations at the Serbian Belgrade Astronomical Observatory in May 2008. Lightcurve analysis showed a period of  hours with a brightness amplitude of 0.18 magnitude, superseding a previous lightcurve from two South-American observatories.

Diameter and albedo 

The Collaborative Asteroid Lightcurve Link assumes a standard albedo for stony asteroids of 0.20 and calculates a diameter of 9.4 kilometers with an absolute magnitude of 12.5.

Palomar–Leiden survey 

The survey designation "P-L" stands for Palomar–Leiden, named after Palomar Observatory and Leiden Observatory, which collaborated on the fruitful Palomar–Leiden survey in the 1960s. Gehrels used Palomar's Samuel Oschin telescope – also known as the 48-inch Schmidt Telescope – and shipped the photographic plates to Ingrid and Cornelis van Houten at Leiden where astrometry was carried out. The trio are credited with the discovery of several thousand minor planets.

Naming 

This minor planet was named after the Egyptian pharaoh Amenemhět III (1844–1797 B.C.), who built the Great Canal (Mer-Wer) and brought prosperity to the Faiyum Oasis by linking it with the Nile. The area then became a breadbasket for the country. At the Hawara site in Faiyum, he built a mortuary temple, which the Greek historian Herodotus referred to as "labyrinth". Amenemhět's father was the pharaoh Sesostris III (also see the minor planets 4414 Sesostris and 3092 Herodotus). The official naming citation was published on 1 September 1993.

References

External links 
 Asteroid Lightcurve Database (LCDB), query form (info )
 Dictionary of Minor Planet Names, Google books
 Asteroids and comets rotation curves, CdR – Observatoire de Genève, Raoul Behrend
 Discovery Circumstances: Numbered Minor Planets (5001)-(10000) – Minor Planet Center
 
 

005010
Discoveries by Cornelis Johannes van Houten
Discoveries by Ingrid van Houten-Groeneveld
Discoveries by Tom Gehrels
4594
Named minor planets
005010
19600924